The Royal Dutch Korfball Association (Dutch:  Koninklijk Nederlands Korfbalverbond, or KNKV) is the governing body of korfball in the Netherlands. It organises the main Dutch korfball leagues (Korfbal League and Hoofdklasse) and the more recreative leagues, and the Dutch national team.

History

The association was founded on 2 June 1903 as Dutch Korfball Association (Dutch: Nederlandse Korfbal Bond, or NKB). In 1973 it fused with the Christian Korfball Association (Dutch: Christelijke Korfbalbond, or CKB). Part of the deal was that clubs that were part of the CKB did not have to play on sunday in the new constellation.

The Koninklijk Nederlands Korfbalverbond was one of the founders of the International Korfball Federation, with the Belgian Federation, on 11 June 1933.

References

Korfball in the Netherlands
Sports governing bodies in the Netherlands
1903 establishments in the Netherlands
Sports organizations established in 1903
Korfball governing bodies